The Bangaram-class patrol vessels of the Indian Navy are designed for interdiction against fast moving surface vessels and for search-and-rescue operations in coastal areas and in the exclusive economic zone. They are named after Bangaram in Lakshadweep.

The vessels are designed and built by Garden Reach Shipbuilders and Engineers. The diesel generators on board are supplied by Cummins India. The electronic equipment on board is from Bharat Electronics Limited, ECIL and Hindustan Aeronautics Limited.

Ships of the class

See also
List of active Indian Navy ships

References

 
Ships built in India
Patrol boat classes